Sannata is a Pakistani drama serial aired on ARY Digital. It is directed by Kashif Nisar and written by Saji Gul and stars Saba Qamar, Danish Taimoor and Sajal Aly in lead. Drama is produced by Abdullah Seja and Nauman Masood under their production banner Idream Entertainment.

Plot
Story revolves around two cousins sisters. Due to circumstances young Rukayya ends up being mother to her infant cousin sister and names her Pari.

Pari's mother Husna runs away and marries Babban against wishes of her parents. When she elopes, her only elder brother dies while in search for and her father dies as he could not see his son's death. The family now was left only with Apa Bi (Husna's mother), Salma (Husna,s widow elder sister), Rukayya (Salma's daughter) and Naseeban (Family maid).

While giving birth to Pari, Husna (lived outside her house as Apa Bi didn't let her inside Haveli) dies and Apa Bi disowns Pari and decides to hand her to her father, Babban who might sell her as well. But young Rukayya is very attached with Pari and resents. Years pass by and young Rukayya gets mature at a very young age. With help of Naseeban, she grows up Pari.

In their childhood they meet their cousin Aazam who is younger than Rukayya. Aazam's father, Ashfaq is the brother of Apa Bi and who after death of her husband managed their business and manages their expenses as well. During their first visit young Pari fights with Aazam and Aazam' mother Nafisa (the second wife of Ashfaq) scolds Pari and leaves.

Apa Bi hates pari and called her Dayan (witch) who will eat devour the whole house.

In background there are past lives of Naseeban being shown where she falls in love with a tree.

Show takes a leap, Now Pari is grown up teenager while Rukayya has crossed 30 and is too old to get married.

Aazam now grown up visits the Haveli frequently and Pari who is extremely possessive for Rukayya hates him as she thinks he might marry Rukayya and take her away from her. Aazam develops a liking for Rukayya. He visits again and distances herself from Rukayya and gets close to Pari.

Meanwhile, Pari suffers from attacks and Rukayya takes her to Mosque and Hakim for her treatment. At mosque she meets Shauki, a beggar who stares/stalks Pari.

Aazam visits again and due to situations Pari gets attack again, Rukayya calls hakim and Aazam doesn't like his way of treatment and takes Rukayya and Pari to his home for pari's treatment. Pari suffers from Epilepsy and personality disorder. There he confesses to Rukayya that he loves Pari only because she is so important to her. He asks her to marry him to which she refuses as she is much older to him.

Rukayya returns to their Haveli along with Pari and Aazam writes her lot of letters. Later after lot of problems Rukayya and Aazam get married. During their marriage Pari dressed up as bribe and starts calling herself Rukayya. Rukayya and Aazam ignore this and take her together at Aazam's home.

Pari tried to get close to Aazam and Aazam decided to send her back to Haveli. She is mistreated at Haveli and she runs away with Shauki in search of her father.

Shauki's past life story runs in background.

Rukayya and Aazam call police, but Pari was untraceable. Shauki finds Babban in city, but old and ill Babban refuses to identify himself to them. Shauki leaves Pari at a peer so that she is safe there. Meanwhile, police kill Shauki and beat up Babban to know where is Pari. But he doesn't say anything. He asks her friend Neelam to search for Pari. Pari starts to live with Babban. Babban realises his mistakes and realises that he might die. He takes Pari to Husna's grave and dies there.

Meanwhile, Rukayya and Aazam go for a body's identification as it might be Pari. In the process Rukayya suffers a miscarriage. Aazam learns that she will never be able to bear child but doesn't tell Rukayya.

Neelam goes to Haveli to meet Apa Bi who is paralysed. She reads a letter written by Husna and returns Husna's earring. Looking at Apa Bi's cold behaviour Neelam leaves.

After three years, Rukayya finds Pari at a rehab where they deal with split personality disorder patients. Rukayya brings her to her house. Later Rukayya discovers that she will not be able to bear child. She asks Aazam to marry Pari. After arguments he marries Pari and Pari due to her disorder pretends to be Rukayya. Pari becomes pregnant and asks Rukayya to leave Aazam or she will kill their child as she believes Aazam and Rukayya only want a child and they don't love her. Rukayya goes back to Haveli. Angey Aazam visits and scolds Rukayya and asks her to stop playing with her emotions.

Next day, Pari says sorry to Rukayya and asks for forgiveness. Rukayya asks why is she saying so. She pushes Rukayya from the stairs and she is hospitalised. Her heartbeat stops. Aazam is heartbroken and comes to Haveli and sees Pari sitting below a tree where she was born. He shouts at her that she got what she wanted, Rukayya is no more. He said I will always hate you and you will never be able to become Rukayya who is the only love of his life. Pari dies (saying Rukayya will die as she feels she is Rukayya). Meanwhile, in hospital Rukayya's heartbeat resumes and she opens her eyes.

The drama closes that everyone accused Pari to take away everything from Rukayya, her childhood, her toys, her life, her husband and now she took away Rukayya's death as well.

Cast
 Saba Qamar as Rukayya, Pari's cousin who brings him up with love and much affection
 Arisha Razi as Rukayya (young)
 Danish Taimoor as Azam, Rukayya's cousin adored by her beauty
 Sajal Aly in dual role as:
 Pari, Rukayya's cousin and much dependent on her
 Husna, Pari's mother who elopes from her house
 Samina Ahmad as Aapa Bi, Husna and Salma's mother and matriarch of the family
 Nadia Afgan as Salma, Rukayya's mother and Aapa Bi's widow daughter
 Shabbir Jan as Ashfaq, Azam's father
 Nargis Rasheed as Naseeban, maid in Aap Bi's house
 Yumna Zaidi as Naseeban (young)
 Saleem Mairaj as Babban
 Adnan Shah Tipu as Shauki
 Seemi Raheel as Najma
 Rashid Mehmood as Taya
 Faiza Gillani as Neelam

Accolades

Nominations

Lux Style Awards
Best TV Actress - Saba Qamar
Best TV Actress - Sajal Aly
Best TV Writer - Saji Gul
Best TV Director - Kashif Nisar

References

External links
 Sannata on Official website
 

2010s Pakistani television series
Pakistani drama television series
2014 Pakistani television series endings
2013 Pakistani television series debuts
ARY Digital original programming
Pakistani horror fiction television series